Martin Bayerstorfer (born 8 May 1966 in Landshut) is a German politician, representative of the Christian Social Union of Bavaria. He was elected in 2002 to represent Landkreis Erding.

See also
List of Bavarian Christian Social Union politicians

References

Christian Social Union in Bavaria politicians
1966 births
Living people
People from Landshut